Angela Mooney Dies Again is a 1997 American-Irish film.

The executive producer was John Boorman.

Cast
Mia Farrow
Patrick Bergin
Brendan Gleeson

Production
The script was awarded a grant in 1989.

Filming took place in July 1996. it was shot at Roger Corman's studios for Concorde Anois but was not a Corman production.

References

External links
Review at Variety

Angela Mooney Dies Again at BFI

1997 films
American drama films
Irish drama films
English-language Irish films
1990s English-language films
1990s American films